Parliamentary elections were held in the Dominican Republic on 16 May 1998. The result was a victory for the opposition Dominican Revolutionary Party-led alliance, which won 83 of the 149 seats in the House of Representatives. Voter turnout was 52.9%.

Results

References

Dominican Republic
1998 in the Dominican Republic
Elections in the Dominican Republic
Election and referendum articles with incomplete results
May 1998 events in North America